Chiliarch is a military rank dating back to antiquity. Originally denoting the commander of a unit of about one thousand men (a chiliarchy) in the Macedonian army, it was subsequently used as a Greek translation of a Persian officer who functioned as a kind of vizier and of the Roman military tribunes. It has subsequently been used for other similar ranks and positions in other armed forces.

Name
The English term chiliarch was borrowed from Latin , a transcription of Greek khilíarkhos and khiliárkhēs, both meaning "commander of a thousand". The name has also occasionally been written as chiliarcha, chiliarchus, or chiliarchos or calqued as thousandman. 

The chiliad or chiliarchy controlled by a chiliarch derives from Latin , from Greek khiliarkhía.

Ancient Macedon and Persia 
At the same time, officers known as pentakosiarchs ("commanders of 500") are also mentioned alongside the chiliarchs under both Alexander the Great and in the Ptolemaic armies, apparently as subordinate officers.

In addition, the title of chiliarch was used as the Greek equivalent of the Achaemenid Persian title  (also transliterated ). The latter often played a role analogous to that of a majordomo or vizier in later times. The Persian office was in turn adopted by Alexander the Great, and first awarded to Hephaestion and after Hephaestion's death to Perdiccas. This Persian-inspired office did not survive into subsequent Hellenistic practice. However, it was revived by later Iranian dynasties: while its existence in the Parthian Empire is unclear, it was certainly in existence in the 3rd century under the Sasanian Empire (Middle Persian:  or ).

Roman and Byzantine Empires

Ancient Rus 

A chiliarch, in Russian  (тысяцкий), was a military leader in Ancient Rus, who commanded a people's volunteer army called тысяча (or a thousand). In the Novgorod Republic, the chiliarch evolved into a judicial or commercial official and was elected from boyars at a veche for a period of one year. Like the posadniks in Novgorod, the office was often held by one man for several years in a row and he was often succeeded by his son or another close relative, indicating that the office was held within clans and was not fully elective.[1] In cities with no veche, chiliarchies were appointed by the knyaz or prince from among the noble boyars and could hand down their post to their sons.
In the Novgorod Republic, chiliarchs were considered representatives of ordinary ("black") people. Along with the role as military leaders, they were also supposed to supervise the city fortifications, convene veches, act as ambassadors and as judges in the commercial courts. Like the posadniks, in the 14th century the former chiliarchs maintained considerable political influence and privileges and were known as "Old Chiliarchs". The earliest documented chiliarch of Novgorod was Putyata.

Grand Prince Dmitry Donskoy, after the death of Vassily Vassilyevich Velyaminov in 1374, abolished the post, replacing it with voyevodas and namestniks. The chiliarch in Novgorod was abolished when Grand Prince Ivan III of Russia conquered the city in 1478. It was abolished in Pskov in 1510 when Vasily III of Russia took that city.

Modern Greece
The title was once again revived during the Greek War of Independence. In January 1822, the First National Assembly at Epidaurus decided to create an organizational framework for the irregular troops of the various independent war leaders, and instituted a number of chiliarchies, each composed of ten centuries of a hundred men under a hecatontarch.

In 1828, the chiliarchies were reorganized and reduced to three, each now comprising two pentakosiarchies of five centuries each, comprising 1120 men in total. Each chiliarch had a small staff comprising an adjutant, a secretary, a priest, a doctor, a paymaster and a quartermaster, while a flag bearer and a trumpeter were allocated to each pentakosiarchy. The 1828-model chiliarchies were abolished after the Battle of Petra in July 1829, and thirteen light infantry battalions formed instead.

Hungary 
The Hungarian rank of ezredes, literally "of a thousand", is the modern, commonly used abbreviation of the obsolete term of ezereskapitány, literally "captain of a thousand". (The term ezereskapitány was used in the War of the Spanish Succession (1701–1714), the ezredes has been used since the Revolutions of 1848.)

An ezredes is the leader of a regiment (about 1000–1500 men in Hungary) and this rank is equivalent to the rank of colonel or major. The term ezredes is used by the Hungarian army (officially the Hungarian Defence Force) and police force too.

Turkey 
The Turkish rank of binbaşı, literally "head of a thousand", is equivalent to the Commonwealth and US rank of Major.

Israel
Chiliarch, in Hebrew Aluf, is the term used in the Israel Defense Forces (IDF) for officers who in other countries would have the rank of general, air marshal, or admiral. There are five chiliarch ranks, constituting the five highest ranks in the IDF. The term aluf comes from a Semitic root meaning "thousand", making an ’allūp̄ the one who commands a thousand people. The Israel Defense Forces (IDF) is an integrated force, ranks are the same in all services. 

Chief chiliarch, Rav aluf: the highest rank in IDF 
Chiliarch, Aluf
Sub-chiliairch, 'Tat aluf
Secondary chiliarch, Aluf mishne
Deputy chilairch, Sgan aluf

See also
 chiliad, a group of 1000 things
 millennium, a group of 1000 years
 Chiliast, an alternative name for Millenarians

References

Further reading
 

Military ranks of Greece
Ancient Greek military terminology
Military ranks of ancient Greece
Military ranks of ancient Macedon
Byzantine military offices
Achaemenid Empire